The 1998 ISAF World Sailing Games was held in Dubai, the United Arab Emirates 3–13 March.

The events were women's match racing, 470 (men and women), Hobie 16 (open and women), J/22 (open and women), men's Laser and women's Laser Radial.

Summary

Medal table

Event medalists

References

ISAF World Sailing Games
ISAF World Sailing Games
Sailing competitions in the United Arab Emirates
ISAF World Sailing Games